Langley Park may refer to places in:


Australia
 Langley Park, Perth, an open space in the central business district of Perth

England
 Langley Park, Buckinghamshire, England, a stately home built by Stiff Leadbetter (1705–1766)
 Langley Park, County Durham, England, a village
 Langley Park Estate, an historic country house estate south of Beckenham, Kent, England
 Langley Park, Norfolk, England, a country house now Langley School

United States
 Langley Park, Maryland, United States, an unincorporated area and census-designated place
 Langley Park (Langley Park, Maryland), an estate listed on the National Register of Historic Places

See also
 Park Langley, a suburb of Beckenham, London, developed on Langley Park Estate
 Langley (disambiguation)